Vyazovka is a rural locality (a selo) and the administrative center of Vayzovskoye Rural Settlement, Yelansky District, Volgograd Oblast, Russia. The population was 2,732 as of 2010. There are 29 streets.

Geography 
Vyazovka is located on the Vyazovka River, 22 km southeast of Yelan (the district's administrative centre) by road. Beryozovka is the nearest rural locality.

References 

Rural localities in Yelansky District
Atkarsky Uyezd